Carlisle Kingmoor Marshalling Yard is a stabling point located in Carlisle, Cumbria, England. The depot is situated on the West Coast Main Line and is near Carlisle station.

History 
From 1950 to 1982, Class 03, 04, 08, 09 shunters, and Class 11, 17, 25, 27, 28, and 40 Diesel Locomotives.

Present 
From 2013, the depot has no allocation. It is, instead, a stabling point for EWS Class 66 and Freightliner Class 70 locomotives.

References 
 

 Railway depots in England
Buildings and structures in Carlisle, Cumbria